Hungo Pavi  is an Ancestral Puebloan great house and archaeological site located in Chaco Canyon, northwestern New Mexico, United States. A set of ruins located just 1 mile (2 km) from the ruins of Una Vida, Hungo Pavi measured  in circumference. Initial explorations revealed 72 ground-level rooms, with structures reaching four stories in height. One large circular kiva has been identified. Its ruins now lie within Chaco Culture National Historical Park.

Citations

References

 

Archaeological sites in New Mexico
Colorado Plateau
Protected areas of San Juan County, New Mexico
Former populated places in New Mexico
Buildings and structures in San Juan County, New Mexico
History of San Juan County, New Mexico
Chaco Culture National Historical Park
Ancestral Puebloans